Oktyabrsky District is an administrative district (raion), one of the thirty-three in Volgograd Oblast, Russia. As a municipal division, it is incorporated as Oktyabrsky Municipal District. It is located in the south of the oblast. Its administrative center is the urban locality (a work settlement) of Oktyabrsky. Population:  24,348 (2002 Census);  The population of the administrative center accounts for 28.3% of the district's total population.

Geography
The district is located south of the oblast, in the area of the Yergeni hills.

References

Notes

Sources

Districts of Volgograd Oblast